This is a list of international prime ministerial trips made by Binali Yıldırım, the 27th prime minister of Turkey during his premiership between 24 May 2016 and 9 July 2018. Yıldırım has made 28 visits to 21 countries in 2 years, his first trip being to Northern Cyprus on 1 June 2016.

List

2016

2017

2018

References 

State visits by Turkish leaders
Turkey diplomacy-related lists
Binali Yıldırım
Yıldırım